This is a list of sieges, land and naval battles of the War of the Fifth Coalition (10 April – 14 October 1809).

See also 
 List of battles of the War of the First Coalition
 List of battles of the War of the Second Coalition
 List of battles of the War of the Third Coalition
 List of battles of the War of the Fourth Coalition
 List of battles of the War of the Sixth Coalition
 List of battles of the Hundred Days (War of the Seventh Coalition)

Notes

References 

Fifth Coalition